Annan District is a coastal district located in the west of Tainan, Taiwan.

History 
After the handover of Taiwan from Japan to the Republic of China in 1945, Anshun was organized as a rural township of Tainan County. In 1946, the township was incorporated into Tainan City and became Annan District.

Geography 
 Area: 107.20 km2
 Population: 199,502 people (January 2023)

Administrative divisions 
The district consists of Tunghe, Anshun, Wennan, Zhounan, Zhoubei, Antung, Anx, Dingan, Anqing, Xinshun, Yuandian, Zongtou, Zhangan, Gongqin, Haitung, Haixi, Hainan, Xixin, Gongwen, Yuantung, Yuanxi, Diantung, Dianxi, Yantian, Nanxing, Xuetung, Chengtung, Chengbei, Chengzhong, Chengnan, Chengxi, Jingcao, Shalun, Xiangong, Luer, Sicao, Anhe, Xibei, Xiding, Xiqi, Haidian, Xingfu, Fenghuang, Meihua, Lixiang, Xitung, Yuanzhong, Budai, Guoan, Anfu and Daan Village.

Education 
 CTBC Business School
 University of Kang Ning

Tourist attractions 

 Luerhmen History and Culture Museum
 National Museum of Taiwan History
 Sicao Fortress
 Sicao Wetlands
 Southwest Coast National Scenic Area
 Taijiang National Park
 Taikang Cultural Center
 Zhongzhouliao Night Market
 Guozhai Night Market

Transportaion
Annan is the western terminus of National Freeway 8, and is also served by Provincial Highways 17, 17A, 17B (Taijing Boulevard), and 19. The district is also served by Sicao Boulevard, and Chengxi Street.

Notable natives 
 Shih Chih-ming, Mayor of Tainan (1989–1997)

See also 
 Tainan

References

External links 

 
 Luerhmen 

Districts of Tainan